CNTRL is the gene that encodes the centriolin protein. 

CNTRL may also refer to:
CNTRL: Beyond EDM, an Electronic Dance Music educational initiative
 A synonym for CTRL, the "Control"/"Ctrl" key on the computer keyboard
CNTRL, the French-language abbreviation for

See also
 CTRL (disambiguation)